Plyometrics, also known as jump training or plyos, are exercises in which muscles exert maximum force in short intervals of time, with the goal of increasing power (speed-strength). This training focuses on learning to move from a muscle extension to a contraction in a rapid or "explosive" manner, such as in specialized repeated jumping. Plyometrics are primarily used by athletes, especially martial artists, sprinters and high jumpers, to improve performance, and are used in the fitness field to a much lesser degree.

Overview
Plyometrics include explosive exercises to activate the quick response and elastic properties of the major muscles. It was initially adopted by Soviet Olympians in the 1950s, and then by sportspeople worldwide.  Sports using plyometrics include basketball, tennis, badminton, squash and volleyball as well as the various codes of football. The term "plyometrics" was coined by Fred Wilt after watching Soviet athletes prepare for their events in track and field.  He began a collaboration with trainer Michael Yessis to promote plyometrics.

Since its introduction in the early 1980s, two forms of plyometrics have evolved. In the original version, created by Russian scientist Yuri Verkhoshansky, it was defined as the shock method.  In this, the athlete would drop down from a height and experience a "shock" upon landing. This in turn would bring about a forced eccentric contraction which was then immediately switched to a concentric contraction as the athlete jumped upward. The landing and takeoff were executed in an extremely short period of time, in the range of 0.1–0.2 second. Explosive plyometrics describes the approach originally created by Verkhoshansky. He experimented with many different exercises, but the depth jump appeared to be the best for duplicating the forces in the landing and takeoff.

The second version of plyometrics, seen to a greater extent in the United States, involves any form of jump regardless of execution time.

Etymology
The term plyometric is a combination of Greek roots that means to increase measurement—plio- means "more" and metric means "length".

Plyo- comes from the Greek word plythein, which means “to increase.” Plio is the Greek word for “more,” and metric literally means “to measure.”

History

Fred Wilt, a former US Olympic long-distance runner, is credited with coining the term plyometrics. He admits that it is not a very good term, but it was the best he could come up with after watching the Russians execute jumps in their warm-ups prior to their event in track and field. He could not understand why the Russians were doing all of these jumps while the Americans were doing multiple static stretches, but he firmly believed it was one of the reasons why they were so successful in many events.
From its beginnings in the early 1980s, the term plyometrics gained greater popularity and is now well established.  When Fred Wilt learned of the work being done by Michael Yessis in the field of Russian training methods, they quickly teamed up to help disseminate information on plyometrics.

In collaboration with Yessis who visited and worked with Verkhoshansky in the Soviet Union in the early 1980s, plyometrics was gradually disseminated in the US. Yessis brought this information on plyometrics back to the US and in the following years was able to create even more ways of using this method to train and improve explosive power. 
  
Plyometrics (the shock method) was created by Yuri Verkhoshansky in the late 1960s, early 1970s. Since then, the shock method of plyometrics is still being practiced for improvement of athletic performance by what appears to be a relatively limited number of athletes. These athletes still do depth jumps, the key exercise in the shock method, according to the guidelines established by Verkhoshansky.

Most athletes execute simple and complex jumps and call them plyometrics rather than jump training as it was called in the past.  This includes the depth jump which was executed in ways different from what was recommended by Verkhoshansky.  This form of jump training is very popular but plyometrics is a buzzword for all types of jumps, regardless of how long it takes to execute the jump. Its use is so pervasive that it is even possible to find push-ups described as being plyometric.

Due to the wide use and appeal of the term plyometrics, the true meaning of plyometrics as developed by  Verkhoshansky has for the most part been forgotten. Verkhoshansky was well known and respected worldwide in both the scientific and in the coaching arenas.  He was relatively unknown in the United States except for some of his articles that were translated and published in the Soviet Sports Review, later called the Fitness and Sports Review International.

In addition to creating the shock method, Verkhoshansky is credited with developing the stretch-shortening concept of muscle contractions and the development of specialized (dynamic correspondence) strength exercises. Plyometrics, or more specifically the shock method, is considered a form of specialized strength development.

Before undertaking plyometric training, it is necessary to distinguish jumps that are commonly called plyometric and true plyometric jumps as exemplified in the depth jump which is illustrative of the shock method. Since its inception in the former Soviet Union as the shock method, there have been other forms of the plyometric exercises created by Yessis that do not involve jump exercises.  For details and illustrations of these exercises see "Explosive Running" and "Explosive Plyometrics".  These exercises involve the stretch-shorten concept that underlies the shock method.

Exercises
 Squat jump (jumping squat, jump squat): combination of jump (not to be confused with tuck jump) and squat. Squat down then jump off the ground as high as possible, with extended and vertical legs.
 Tuck jump (tucked jump, tucked knee jump): with feet shoulder width apart, jump, tuck the legs in, extend them, and land.
 Tuck squat jump: combination of tuck jump and squat jump. Squat down, jump, bring knees up before landing again.
 Lateral jump: from a standing position, jump side to side.
 Power skipping: on each skip, lift the upper leg as high as possible.
 Alternate leg bounding: run with long strides, placing emphasis on hang time.
 Box jumps: jump onto and off of a large box 18" or higher.
 Vertical depth jump: starting from the top of a box, jump down and back up as fast as possible.
 Plyometric push-up (plyo push-up): perform a push up, but exert enough upward force to lift the hands and body off the ground.
 Broad jump (long jump).
 Pike jump.
 Straddle jump (similar to split jumps used by dancers, gymnasts and figure skaters).
 Lunge jump

Method
In the depth jump, the athlete experiences a shock on landing in which the hip, knee, and ankle extensor muscles undergo a powerful eccentric contraction. For the muscles to respond explosively, the eccentric contraction is then quickly switched to the isometric (when the downward movement stops) and then the concentric contraction, in a minimum amount of time.  This allows the athlete to jump upward as high as possible.
  
In the eccentric contraction, the muscles are involuntarily lengthened, while in the concentric contraction, the muscles are shortened after being tensed.  Most of the stretching and shortening takes place in the tendons that attach to the muscles involved rather than in the muscles.  
The height used by most athletes is usually quite low in the early stages of training. The key is how high the athlete jumps in relation to the height of the takeoff platform. Technique and jump height are most important at this time.  
While the body is dropping, the athlete consciously prepares the muscles for the impact by tensing the muscles.  The flooring upon which the athlete drops down on should be somewhat resilient, mainly for prevention of injury. Upon making contact with the floor, the athlete then goes into slight leg flex to absorb some of the force for safety.  However, the main role played by the muscles and tendons is to withstand the force that is experienced in the landing.  This force is withstood in eccentric contraction.  When muscle contraction is sufficiently great, it is able to stop the downward movement very quickly.

This phase is sometimes called the phase of amortization in which the athlete absorbs some of the force and stops downward movement by the strong eccentric contraction of the muscles. The strong eccentric contraction prepares the muscles to switch to the concentric contraction in an explosive manner for takeoff.

When the athlete drops down to the floor, the body experiences an impact upon landing. The higher the height of the step-off platform, the greater the impact force upon landing.  This creates a shock to the body which the body responds to by undergoing a strong involuntary muscular contraction to prevent the body from collapsing on the ground. This in turn produces great tension in the muscles and tendons which is then given back in a return upward movement. The faster the change in the muscular contractions, the greater the power created and the resulting height attained.

More specifically, the muscles and tendons undergo a stretch (eccentric contraction) while landing which is needed to absorb some of the force generated but most importantly, to withstand the force that is produced by the shock that occurs on the landing. The greater the shock (forces experienced on landing), the stronger the eccentric contraction will be, which in turn produces even greater tension.  This tension, which is potential force, is then given back in the return movement when the muscular contractions switch to the concentric or shortening regime.

However, for maximum return of energy, minimum time must elapse from when the force is received to when they are returned. The greater the time between receiving the forces and giving them back, the less is the return and the less the height that can be achieved in the jump.  Most of the lengthening and shortening occurs in the respective muscle tendons which have greater elasticity.

Another way of saying this is that the faster the switching from the eccentric to the concentric contraction, the greater will be the force produced and the greater the return movement.  The speed of the switching is extremely fast, 0.20 seconds or less.  For example, high-level sprinters execute the switch from the eccentric contraction that occurs when the foot hits the ground to the concentric contraction when the foot breaks contact with the ground in less than 0.10 seconds.  In world-class sprinters, the time is approximately 0.08 seconds.
Most athletes start at approximately  after doing some jump training. The main criterion is that the athlete is jumping as high as possible on every jump.

If the athlete gradually improves his jump height, the same platform height is continued until increases in jump height are no longer observed. At this time, takeoff height is increased by a few inches. If the athlete continually fails to jump very high, the height of the drop-down is lowered somewhat.  Most important here is how high the athlete jumps after the drop-down.

Rather than developing greater explosive power this height leads to more eccentric strength development. This occurs when the intensity of the forced involuntary eccentric contraction upon landing is greater than the muscles can withstand. In addition, the athlete will not be able to execute a quick return (fast transition between muscular contractions), which is the key to successful execution of explosive plyometrics.

Because of the forces involved and the quickness of execution, the central nervous system is strongly involved. It is important that the athlete not overdo using the shock plyometric method.  Doing so will lead to great fatigue, and, according to Verkhoshansky, sleep disturbances.  Athletes have great difficulty sleeping well if they execute too many depth jumps. This indicates that athletes must be well-prepared physically before doing this type of training.

Technique of jumping is also very important when executing plyometric exercises. In essence, the athlete goes into a slight squat (crouch) upon landing in which the hip, knee, and ankle joints flex.  The takeoff or jump upward is executed in a sequence initiated by hip-joint extension followed by knee-joint extension which begins during the hip-joint extension.  As the knee-joint extension is taking place, ankle-joint extension begins and is the only action that occurs as the takeoff (breaking contact with the ground) takes place.  All three actions contribute force to the upward jump, but the knee-joint extension is the major contributor.

As simple jumping

The most common type of plyometrics used in the United States is simple and relatively easy jump exercises executed with little regard to execution time. These jumps are effective for athletes who execute skills in their sport that do not require explosive type muscular contractions. An example is long-distance running in which the runners execute repeat actions of 20 to 30 consecutive jumps and other cyclic-type activities such as leaping for multiple repetitions.

Such plyometric jumps are also used as a warm-up for doing explosive plyometric jumps and for initial preparation of the muscles prior to undertaking exercises such as depth jumps.  In essence, they are effective in the early stages of learning how to do plyometric exercises and for preparing the muscles for explosive or quick jumps.  These jumps are similar to those done by youngsters in the playground or in neighborhood games and as such, do not require additional preparation.  Athletes, regardless of their level of expertise, can undertake such jumps in the initial stages of training.

When athletes who have been doing plyometrics without regard to time of execution first attempt to execute explosive plyometrics, they often fail because the time of execution is too long.  This occurs quite often in the depth jump.  The athlete usually sinks (drops) too low which takes too long to make the transition from the eccentric to the concentric contraction.  As a result, the exercise becomes a jump-strength exercise and not a true plyometric one.

Jump technique remains the same regardless of whether it is a true plyometric exercise or a jump exercise. The hips, knees, and ankles flex when landing and the joints extend on the upward return. The sequence and overlapping in the sequence is basically the same, beginning with the hip extension, followed by knee extension, and ending with the ankle-plantar flexing.  The major differences in execution are the depth of the landing and the time of executing the switch from the eccentric to the concentric contraction.

Studies have been conducted testing ten various plyometric exercises on overall performance during jumping examined by EMG, power, and ground reaction force (GRF). Of the ten exercises, the single-leg cone hops, box jumps, tuck jumps, and two-legged vertical jumps produced the highest EMG values, alluding to greater motor recruitment. Power was examined in dumbbell jumps, depth jumps, countermovement jumps, squat jumps, and tuck jumps which all produced the higher power scale readings. In terms of athletic performance and training, the plyometric movements that utilize total body vibration produced an overall increase in performance output. A recent study examined two groups using the same plyometric protocol in combination with weight training, one using high loads and the other utilizing small loads, and similar decreases in power were found. This shows that the  plyometric exercises themselves had a greater effect in the decrease in power output rather than the type of weight training.

Safety considerations
Plyometrics have been shown to have benefits for reducing lower extremity injuries in team sports while combined with other neuromuscular training (i.e. strength training, balance training, and stretching). Plyometric exercises involve an increased risk of injury due to the large force generated during training and performance, and should only be performed by well conditioned individuals under supervision. Good levels of physical strength, flexibility, and proprioception should be achieved before beginning plyometric training.

The specified minimum strength requirement varies depending on where the information is sourced and the intensity of the plyometrics being performed. Chu (1998) recommends that a participant be able to perform 50 repetitions of the squat exercise at 60% of his or her body weight before doing plyometrics. Core (abdomen) strength is also important.

Flexibility is required both for injury prevention and to enhance the effect of the stretch shortening cycle. Some advanced training methods combine plyometrics and intensive stretching in order to both protect the joint and make it more receptive to the plyometric benefits.

Proprioception is an important component of balance, coordination and agility, which is also required for safe performance of plyometric exercises.

Further safety considerations include:

 Age: should be taken into account for both prepubescent and the elderly because of hormonal changes.
 Technique: a participant must be instructed on proper technique before commencing any plyometric exercise. He or she should be well rested and free of injury in any of the limbs to be exercised.

Plyometrics are not inherently dangerous, but the highly focused and intense movements used in repetition increase the potential level of stress on joints and musculo-tendonous units. Therefore, safety precautions are strong prerequisites to this particular method of exercise. Low-intensity variations of plyometrics are frequently utilized in various stages of injury rehabilitation, indicating that the application of proper technique and appropriate safety precautions can make plyometrics safe and effective for many people.

Benefits 

Many professional and Olympic athletes use plyometrics training to improve muscular strength and jumping abilities which therefore increases their power. There are  varying levels of intensity to plyometrics. Another benefit of plyometrics is that you can vary your level of intensity which means anyone looking to improve strength and jumping training can be involved regardless of fitness. With there being so many exercises this means you are less likely to get burned out and have a wide range of exercises to choose from. Another good reason with so many exercises being available are that you can find exercises that don't require the use of any equipment. It also increases muscular strength and endurance, also increases metabolic rate which increases weight loss and heart rate.

Loaded plyometrics 

Plyometric exercises are sometimes performed with an additional load, or weight added. In such cases, they are referred to as loaded plyometrics or weighted jumps. The weight is held or worn. It may be in the form of a barbell, trap bar, dumbbells, or weighted vest. For instance, a vertical jump whilst holding a trap bar or jumping split squats whilst holding dumbbells. In addition, a regular weight lifting exercise is sometimes given a plyometric component, such as is found in a loaded jump squat. Jumping onto plyo boxes or over hurdles whilst holding weights is not recommended for safety reasons. The advantage of loaded plyometric exercises is that they increase the overall force with which the exercise is performed. This can enhance the positive effect of the exercise and further increase the practitioner's ability to apply explosive power.

See also 

 Ballistic training
 Calisthenics
 Complex training
 Parkour
 Power training
 Strength training

References

Further reading
 Brooks, G.A.; Fahey, T.D. & White, T.P. (1996). Exercise Physiology: Human Bioenergetics and Its Applications (2nd ed.). Mountain View, California: Mayfield Publishing Co. . .

Physical exercise
Strength training
Weight training methodologies